"Do You Love What You Feel" is a 1989 single by Inner City. The single is not to be confused with the 1979 crossover song of the same name by Rufus and Chaka Khan. The single continued Inner City's success on both the American dance play and UK charts.  The single made the top twenty on the UK singles chart and reached number one on the Dance Club Play chart for one week.

References

1989 singles
Inner City (band) songs
1989 songs
Songs written by Kevin Saunderson
Songs written by Paris Grey